ChronoBlade is an indie 2D free-to-play online game developed and published by American independent video game company nWay Games. It was currently published on Facebook and has also been launched on Android and IOS devices.

Plot
ChronoBlade takes place in the Multiverse where countless possible Earths exist, but each reality has been invaded by the army of the Chronarch Imperium. As a last resort, four survivors named Aurok, Lophi, Thera and Lucas decide to band together and found "ChronoBlade," the faction that can oppose Chronarchs and save reality itself.

Reception
ChronoBlade received middlingly reviews on release, with reviewers praising the game's gameplay as visceral and brutal but criticizing the game's progression systems as a grind.

References

External links
nWay Games website
Official website

2012 video games
Action role-playing video games
Android (operating system) games
Browser-based multiplayer online games
Facebook games
Free online games
Indie video games
IOS games
Role-playing video games
Video games developed in the United States
Video games about parallel universes